Iloilo Doctors' College is an institution of higher education located in Molo, Iloilo City, Philippines. It was established on February 13, 1972, as the Iloilo Doctors Hospital School of Nursing and Midwifery. It opened its doors to the first nursing and midwifery students in June 1972. At its inception, the school functioned as the educational arm of the Iloilo Doctor's Hospital (IDH), founded the year before.

Departments
School of Dentistry
Doctor of Dental Medicine
School of Physical Therapy
Bachelor of Science in Physical Therapy
College of Nursing
Bachelor of Science in Nursing
Bachelor of Science in Nursing for Professionals
Bachelor of Science in Nursing for Medical Graduates
Health Aide Course
College of Paramedicine
Bachelor of Science in Medical Laboratory Science
Bachelor of Science in Radiologic Technology
Associate in Radiologic Technology
College of Arts and Sciences
Bachelor of Science in Biological Science
Bachelor of Science in Social Work
Pre-Dental Course
College of Business Administration
Bachelor of Science in Management
Bachelor of Science in Banking and Finance
Junior Medical Secretarial Course
Computer Secretarial Course
College of Criminology
Bachelor of Science in Criminology
College of Information Technology
Bachelor of Science in Information Management
Bachelor of Science in Information Technology
Bachelor of Science in Computer Science
Associate in Computer Technology
School of Midwifery
Midwifery Course
Child Learning Center
Nursery Kindergarten 1
Kindergarten 2
Grade 1
Affiliate:
Iloilo Doctors’ College of Medicine
Doctor of Medicine

References

External links
Iloilo Doctors' College official website

Medical schools in the Philippines
Nursing schools in the Philippines
Dental schools in the Philippines
Universities and colleges in Iloilo City